Valentin Guznac (born 24 October 1961) is a Moldovan politician, who served as local public administration minister (2007–09).

Biography 
Valentin Guznac was born on October 24, 1961, in the village of Corlăteni, Rîșcani District. After graduating from the middle school in his native village, he enrolled in 1979 as a student at the Faculty of Mechanics of the Polytechnic Institute "Serghei Lazo" in Chisinau. He also graduated from the Academy of Public Administration alongside the President of the Republic of Moldova and the Baltic Institute of Economics, Ecology and Law in St. Petersburg.

He has been a member of the Parliament of Moldova since 2009.

External links 
 Site-ul Parlamentului Republicii Moldova

References

1961 births
Living people
Moldovan MPs 2009–2010
Democratic Party of Moldova MPs